Galaxy On Fire 2 is a spaceflight simulation video game created and distributed by Fishlabs in 2009.

Overview
The game revolves around spaceflight and space combat, set in a universe with multiple star systems. Players can fight enemies/friends, mine for ore, trade commodities, and complete jobs such as freelance missions.

Plot
The game follows the adventures of Keith T. Maxwell, as he is sent forwards in time after a malfunction with his hyperdrive, caused by damage from a skirmish in an asteroid belt. His craft, hurtling out of control with Keith unconscious, is put in an orbit around Var Hastra by the onboard flight computer, before being salvaged by an ore dealer and towed to the orbiting space station. The dealer, Gunant Breh, tells Keith of events that happened while Keith was unconscious. Breh then tasks Keith with collecting ore from an old mining ship. While mining, the ship comes under attack by pirates, and Keith flies back to the station. Unhappy with having to run away from the pirates, Keith convinces Gunant to help him take out the pirates in the area. After fighting off the pirates, Keith is told to visit a neighbouring planet, as the space station there recently lost contact. While investigating, Keith comes across his old friend Mkkt Bkkt, who explains that the crew of the station have been infected with 'neuro-algae', and are subsequently intoxicated.

After being given control of completing side quests, Keith is informed of a Terran convoy in the system, and that he could be picked up and sent back to Terran space. Upon arrival, the convoy is under attack by pirates. One of the gunners of the main vessel mistakes Keith's ship as another pirate, and disables it with an EMP blast. Keith is then transported aboard the ship as a prisoner. After arriving at Alioth station, Keith meets commander Brent Snocom. While they are talking, the conversation is suddenly interrupted by a Void attack outside the station. Keith, along with other pilots, are sent to defend the station. The Void fighters destroy a group of freighters, before escaping through a wormhole back into their territory. Back at the station, Snocom explains to Keith about the Voids.

Keith is told to meet a scientist,a certain Lieutenant Thomas Boyle who can provide more information on the Voids, but Boyle is held hostage by pirates. Keith then rescues Boyle and defeats the pirates, before taking him to a secret research facility at Thynome. From there, Keith meets Dr Carla Paolini, a scientist, and is told to return samples of Void technology, by travelling to a raid on another convoy. The Voids escape, but not after Keith destroys one of their fighters. It is from here that Keith meets Khador, an advanced alien who is developing a 'Khador Drive', which can transport a vessel instantly to another part of the galaxy, eliminating the need of jump gates.

Khador sends Keith on a mission to mine Void crystals, accessing Void space through a wormhole. After collecting 50 crystals, Khador has enough to construct the Khador Drive, and gives it to Keith. As these events are going on, the Terran and Vossk Empire agree to develop a strategy for ending the Void threat. They use a converted Vossk freighter, packed with explosives, which is sent through a wormhole, to destroy the Void 'mothership'. Keith provides escort to the freighter as it comes under fire. The Voids manage to cripple the freighter, so the pilot on board has to manually guide the freighter into the mothership. The freighter collides with the vessel, killing the pilot on board. After escaping through another wormhole, Keith flies back to Thynome, and goes on a date with Carla.

DLCs
Galaxy on Fire 2 included a few DLCs to add on to the experience. These DLCs include two new campaigns, and the player's own personal space station at the Shima system. The official names to these DLCs are "Valkyrie," "Supernova," and "Kaamo Club."

Kaamo Club
The Kaamo Club is the player's own personal space station where the player can store an unlimited number of ships, weapons, equipment, and commodities. When acquired, the Kaamo Club is usable when Keith leaves the tutorial section of the game at Var Hastra. It will be found in the Shima system, orbiting a lone planet called Kaamo. Officially, it is in Midorian space, which is why it has a Midorian jump gate. 
Inside the Kaamo Club, in the Space Lounge, there are six specialists. They can sell the player specialty weapons, ships, and mods to the player's space craft at a cost proportional to the ship cost. These services include upgrading overall armor, handling, cargo hold, and an additional equipment slot. The two other specialists will sell the player unique ships and weapons/equipment, which are sold for a given time and at a fixed cost.

HD and Full HD releases
Galaxy On Fire 2 was re-released for newer devices as an HD version, which features more detail and better graphics. A 'Full HD' version was also released, specifically for the Apple Mac and Windows computers. However, some content was cut from version for Windows, such as the Valkyrie and Supernova DLCs, and the systems Loma and Shima.

Reviews
The game received a 6/10 review on GameSpot, and a 90% score on Metacritic

References

External links
 

2010 video games
IOS games
Video games developed in Germany
Space trading and combat simulators
Windows games
J2ME games
Deep Silver games